Rasul Ibrahimov (born 13 August 1981) is an Azerbaijani chess player who holds the title of Grandmaster (GM). He earned the International Master (IM) title in 2000 and the Grandmaster title in 2005. He was a member of the Azerbaijan Chess Olympiad team in 2002 and 2004. He has served as the coach of top female Azerbaijani chess player Gunay Mammadzada.

References

1981 births
Living people
Chess grandmasters
Chess players from Baku